Principal Financial Group is an American global financial investment management and insurance company headquartered in Des Moines, Iowa, U.S.

Business operations 
Four segments comprise the company: Retirement and Income Solutions, Principal Global Investors, Principal International, and U.S. Insurance Solutions.

The company employs roughly 9,000 people in Des Moines, Iowa, and owns and operates several buildings in the downtown area. The tallest, known as 801 Grand, is 45 stories tall (192m/630 ft), and houses many other companies in addition to Principal.

As of March 2014, Principal employed 14,600 employees worldwide, with its Global Delivery center, Principal Global Services, in Pune, Maharashtra, India.

Principal also has a lobbyist registered in the Iowa Legislature since December 2016. He is designated to lobby the Executive Branch of the Government of Iowa.

In 2019, Principal purchased Wells Fargo's institutional retirement and trust business (including 401k, pension, executive deferred compensation, employee stock ownership plans and asset advice business) for $1.2 billion. The deal was financed with cash and senior debt financing.

In 2021, activist investor firm Elliott Investment Management took a stake in Principal, saying it will push for changes at the company. Talks with Elliott resulted in the February 2021 announcement of two new independent directors to its board of directors.

Eddie

Eddie was the lead and central character in the marketing campaign of the Principal Financial Group from 2005 to 2015. Eddie's television and print ads often depicted him facing challenges and using the Principal Edge logo to solve his financial, business, and everyday life problems. Eddie retired in 2015 in preparation for the company's new logo that debuted in 2016.

Naming rights 
Principal owns the naming rights to Principal Riverwalk, Principal Park and The Principal Charity Classic in Des Moines.

Management 
On 20 August 2020, the company announced that Ken McCullum would become the new chief risk officer, following the retirement of Julia Lawler.

See also 
 List of United States insurance companies
Principal Mutual Fund India

References

External links 
 The Principal Financial Group Official Website

Companies listed on the Nasdaq
Companies based in Des Moines, Iowa
Financial services companies established in 1879
1879 establishments in Iowa
Financial services companies of the United States
Former mutual insurance companies
Life insurance companies of the United States